Wives with Knives is an American documentary television series on Investigation Discovery produced by David Frank of Indigo Films. The series debuted on November 23, 2012. Season 2, which consists of eight episodes, premiered on November 29, 2013.

Premise
Wives with Knives tells the story of various women who committed crimes on their partners. Within each episode, the women tell the tale of the crime they committed and what led each couple to their demise. Interviews with the victims themselves are also shown.

Episodes

See also
Deadly Women
Facing Evil with Candice DeLong
Snapped
Sejal Allora Patel

References

External links
 

2010s American documentary television series
2012 American television series debuts
English-language television shows
Investigation Discovery original programming
2017 American television series endings